Corentin Ermenault (born 27 January 1996) is a French road and track cyclist, who currently rides for French amateur team Team Bricquebec Cotentin. His father, Philippe Ermenault, was also a professional cyclist.

Major results

Track

2013
 UEC European Junior Championships
1st  Madison (with Jordan Levasseur)
2nd  Team pursuit
3rd  Individual pursuit
 National Junior Championships
1st  Individual pursuit
3rd Team pursuit
2014
 UEC European Junior Championships
1st  Points race
2nd  Individual pursuit
 National Junior Championships
1st  Individual pursuit
1st  Madison (with Adrien Garel)
1st  Team pursuit
 2nd Team pursuit, National Championships
2015
 National Championships
2nd Team pursuit
3rd Individual pursuit
 3rd  Individual pursuit, UEC European Under-23 Championships
2016
 UEC European Championships
1st  Individual pursuit
1st  Team pursuit
 1st  Team pursuit, UEC European Under-23 Championships
 National Championships
1st  Team pursuit
2nd Individual pursuit
2nd Omnium
3rd Points race
 UCI World Cup
2nd Team pursuit, Glasgow
2017
 1st  Team pursuit, UEC European Championships
 National Championships
1st  Team pursuit
2nd Individual pursuit
2018
 National Championships
1st  Individual pursuit
1st  Madison (with Adrien Garel)
1st  Team pursuit
2nd Scratch race
3rd Omnium
2019
 1st  Individual pursuit, UEC European Championships
 National Championships
1st  Individual pursuit
1st  Scratch race
2nd Madison
2nd Points race
2nd Team pursuit
 UCI World Cup
1st Team pursuit, Milton
2nd Team pursuit, Minsk
3rd Team pursuit, Glasgow
2020
 3rd  Individual pursuit, UCI World Championships
2021
 1st  Individual pursuit, National Championships
2022
 UCI Nations Cup
1st Individual pursuit, Glasgow
1st Team pursuit, Glasgow
2023
 3rd  Team pursuit, UEC European Championships

Road

2013
 4th Time trial, UEC European Junior Championships
 7th Time trial, UCI World Junior Championships
2014
 1st  Time trial, National Junior Championships
 2nd  Time trial, UEC European Junior Championships
 7th Paris–Roubaix Juniors
2016
 National Under-23 Championships
2nd Time trial
3rd Road race
 3rd Ronde van Vlaanderen Beloften
 4th Time trial, UEC European Under-23 Championships
 6th Overall ZLM Tour
 7th Duo Normand (with Rémi Cavagna)
 8th Paris–Troyes
2017
 3rd  Time trial, UCI World Under-23 Championships
 3rd  Time trial, UEC European Under-23 Championships
 3rd Time trial, National Under-23 Championships
 5th Paris–Tours Espoirs
2019
 10th Grand Prix de la Somme
2021
 1st  Time trial B, Paralympic Games (Pilot for Alexandre Lloveras)
2022
 1st Stage 1 Tour de la Mirabelle

References

External links

1996 births
Living people
French male cyclists
European Games competitors for France
Cyclists at the 2019 European Games
Sportspeople from Amiens
Cyclists at the 2020 Summer Paralympics
Cyclists from Hauts-de-France